Roshewadi is a village in the Karmala taluka of Solapur district in Maharashtra state, India.

Demographics
Covering  and comprising 172 households at the time of the 2011 census of India, Roshewadi had a population of 917. There were 488 males and 429 females, with 101 people being aged six or younger.

References

Villages in Karmala taluka